The Auroville Marathon is an annual marathon event that courses through the city of Dawn Auroville in Tamil Nadu state of India. They also have Half Marathon (21.0975 km or 13.1094 mi) and 10k runs added. It is one of the largest and most popular running event in India, with participants from different parts of India. The event is largely publicised by word of mouth and through blogs and other social networks by runners who have run the race before.

The event is organised by Auroville Runners in association with Auroville community since 2008. Originally started to celebrate the 40 years of Auroville, the enthusiastic participation attracted many runners from other cities, and it was decided to make it an annual affair. The event is non-commercial and organised purely for the joy of running. It considers all the finishers as winners and does not award any prize money for the early finishers. That is precisely why this is not a timed run.

Results

Full Marathon: Men

Full Marathon: Women

Victories by nationality

Notes

Marathons in India
Sport in Tamil Nadu
2008 establishments in Tamil Nadu
marathon
Recurring sporting events established in 2008